The Omnibus Budget Reconciliation Act of 1987 (or OBRA-87) was federal law that was enacted by the 100th United States Congress and signed into law by President Ronald Reagan.

Specifics

Title I: Agriculture and Related Programs
Subtitle A: Adjustments to Agricultural Commodity Programs
Subtitle B: Optional Acreage Diversion
Subtitle C: Farm Program Payments
Subtitle D: Rural Electrification Administration Programs
Subtitle E: Miscellaneous

Title II: National Economic Commission

Title III: Education Programs
Subtitle A: Guaranteed Student Loan Program Savings
Subtitle B: Sale of College Facilities and Housing Loans

Title IV: Medicare, Medicaid, and Other Health-Related Programs
Subtitle A: Medicare
Subtitle B: Medicaid
Subtitle C: Nursing Home Reform
Subtitle D: Vaccine Compensation
Subtitle E: Rural Health

Title V:Energy and Environment Programs
Subtitle A: Nuclear Waste Amendments
Subtitle B: Federal Onshore Oil and Gas Leasing Reform Act of 1987
Subtitle C: Land and Water Conservation Fund and Tongass Timber Supply Fund
Subtitle D: Reclamation
Subtitle E: Panama Canal
Subtitle F: Abandoned Mine Funds in Wyoming
Subtitle G: Nuclear Regulatory Commission User Fees

Title VI: Civil Service and  Service Programs

Title VII: Veterans Programs

Title VIII: Budget Policy and Fiscal Procedures

Title IX: Income Security and Related Programs

Title X: Revenue Provisions

Legislative history
The bill was introduced in the House on October 26, 1987. It was passed in the House on October 29, 1987, and passed in the Senate on December 11, 1987. President Reagan signed the bill into public law on December 22, 1987.

References

External links
 , Legislative History

1987 in law
1987
1987 in economics
100th United States Congress
Medicare and Medicaid (United States)
United States federal health legislation